Samy Mmaee A Nwambeben (born 8 September 1996) is a professional footballer who plays as a centre-back for Ferencváros. Born in Belgium, he represents Morocco at international level.

Club career
Mmaee joined Standard Liège in 2013 from Gent. On 25 July 2014, he made his Belgian Pro League debut with Standard Liège against Charleroi.

Mmaae was signed by Nemzeti Bajnokság I club Ferencvárosi TC in 2021.

International career
Mmaee was born in Belgium to a Cameroonian father and Moroccan mother. He is a youth international for Belgium. He represented the Morocco national team in a friendly 3–1 win over Senegal on 9 October 2020.

Personal life
Mmaee's brothers Ryan, Camil, and Jack Mmaee are also professional footballers.

Honours
Standard Liège
Belgian Cup: 2015–16

Ferencvàros
Nemzeti Bajnokság: 2020–21, 2021–22
Magyar Kupa: 2021–22

References

External links

1995 births
Living people
People from Halle, Belgium
Moroccan footballers
Footballers from Flemish Brabant
Belgian footballers
Association football central defenders
Morocco international footballers
Belgium under-21 international footballers
Morocco youth international footballers
Belgium youth international footballers
2021 Africa Cup of Nations players
Black Belgian sportspeople
Moroccan people of Cameroonian descent
Sportspeople of Cameroonian descent
Belgian sportspeople of Moroccan descent
Belgian people of Cameroonian descent
Standard Liège players
MVV Maastricht players
Sint-Truidense V.V. players
Ferencvárosi TC footballers
Belgian Pro League players
Eerste Divisie players
Nemzeti Bajnokság I players
Moroccan expatriate footballers
Belgian expatriate footballers
Expatriate footballers in the Netherlands
Expatriate footballers in Hungary
Moroccan expatriate sportspeople in the Netherlands
Belgian expatriate sportspeople in the Netherlands
Moroccan expatriate sportspeople in Hungary
Belgian expatriate sportspeople in Hungary